Egil or Egill is a masculine given name derived from Old Norse. It may refer to:

People

Various
Ongentheow (died 515), legendary Swedish king

Egil
Egil, brother of Volund, legendary archer of Germanic mythology
Egil, leader of Mechonis and antagonist in Xenoblade Chronicles
Egil (Hymiskvida), a character in the poem Hymiskvida
Egil One-Hand, Viking Berserker from Egils saga einhenda ok Ásmundar berserkjabana
Egil of Fulda (died 822), abbot and hagiographer, wrote the Vita Sturmi
Egil Aarvik (1912–1990), Norwegian politician 
Egil Bjerklund (born 1933), Norwegian ice hockey player
Egil Eide (1868–1946), Norwegian actor and film director 
Egil Werner Erichsen (1901–2000), Norwegian corporate director and politician 
Egil Eriksen (1909–1996), Norwegian educator and politician for the Labour Party
Egil Fjetland (born 1962), Norwegian footballer
Egil Gjelland (born 1973), former Norwegian biathlete
Egil Halmøy (1901–1984), Norwegian politician for the Liberal Party
Egil Harder (1917–1997), Danish composer
Egil Hegerberg (born 1970), Norwegian comedian and musician
Egil Helle (1923–2006), Norwegian newspaper editor, information worker and biographer
Egil Hestnes (born 1943), Norwegian politician
Egil Hjorth-Jenssen (1893–1969), Norwegian actor and theatre director
Egil Hylleraas (1898–1965), Norwegian theoretical physicist
Egil Jacobsen (1897–1923), Danish chess master
Egil Remi Jensen (born 1929), Norwegian newspaper editor
Egil Johansen (musician) (1934–1998), known as Egil "Bop" Johansen, Norwegian-Swedish jazz drummer
Egil Johansen (footballer) (born 1962), Norwegian footballer
Egil Johansen (orienteer) (born 1954), Norwegian orienteer
Egil Kapstad (1940–2017), Norwegian Jazz pianist, composer and arranger
Egil Kjølner (1920–2010), Norwegian politician for the Christian Democratic Party
Egil Kraggerud (born 1939), Norwegian philologist
Egil Krogh (1939–2020), American lawyer
Egil Lærum (1921–1954), Norwegian footballer, ski jumper and athlete
Egil Oddvar Larsen (1923–2009), Norwegian politician
Egil Ly (born 1938), Norwegian sailor
Egil Nyhus (born 1962), Norwegian illustrator
Egil Offenberg (1899–1975), Norwegian businessperson and politician
Egil Olbjørn (1902–1982), Norwegian police leader
Egil Olsen (born 1942), Norwegian football manager and footballer
Egil Østenstad (born 1972), footballer player
Egil Reichborn-Kjennerud (1903–1974), Norwegian judge, cyclist and sports administrator
Egil Reksten (1917–2009), Norwegian engineer and resistance member during World War II
Egil Søby (born 1945), Norwegian sprint canoer 
Egil Solsvik (1916–2005), Norwegian wrestler
Egill Skallagrímsson, the protagonist of Egil's Saga - see Egill Skallagrimsson
Egil Sundar (1932–1994), Norwegian journalist and newspaper editor
Egil Svartdahl (born 1954), Norwegian TV-pastor
Egil Taule (born 1934), Norwegian businessperson
Egil Toreng (1922–2015), Norwegian newspaper editor and politician
Egil Törnqvist (1932–2015), Professor Emeritus of Scandinavian Studies at the University of Amsterdam and an academic literary critic
Egil Tynæs (1941–2004), Norwegian doctor
Egil A. Wyller (born 1925), Norwegian philosopher, historian, non-fiction writer and translator

Egill
Egill Örn Egilsson (born 1966), also known as Eagle Egilsson, Icelandic director and cinematographer
Egill Einarsson or Gillz (born 1980), Icelandic private fitness coach, author and musician
Egill Knutzen (1914–1990), Norwegian fencer. He competed at the 1936, 1948 and 1952 Summer Olympics
Egill Skallagrímsson (910–990), famous Viking, community, leader, and Icelandic settler
Egill Reimers (1878–1946), Norwegian architect and sailor who competed in the 1920 Summer Olympics

Middle name
 Tor Egil Kreken (born 1977), Norwegian musician

See also
Egils (given name)

Masculine given names
Norwegian masculine given names